The Illyrians were a conglomeration of Indo-European peoples and tribes in the Balkan Peninsula, Southeastern Europe.

Illyrian tribes

Possibly related peoples 

Antitani / Atintanes / Atintani? (Illyrian Atintani)
Dassaretae (Dassareti)?
Turboletae

Pannonians

Eastern group 
Amantini / Amantes
Andes / Andizetes
Azali
Breuci
Colapiani
Oseriates / Osseriates
Ditiones
Jasi
Pirustae / Pirusti
Ceraunii
Glintidiones
Scirtari
Siculotae

Western group 
Daesitiates
Maezaei / Maizaioi / Mazaioi
Segestani

Paeonians 

There are different views and still no agreement among scholars about the Paeonians/Paeones ethnic and linguistic kinship. Some such as Wilhelm Tomaschek and Paul Kretschmer claim that the language spoken by the Paeonians belonged to the Illyrian family, while Dimitar Dechev claims affinities with Thracian. Irwin L. Merker considers that the language spoken by the Paeonians was closely related to Greek (and ancient Macedonian if it was a distinct language from ancient Greek), a Hellenic language with "a great deal of Illyrian and Thracian influence as a result of this proximity".

Agrianes (also, Agriani and Agrii) (it is also claimed that this tribe was Thracian)
Almopians (also Almopioi)
Derrones (also Derroni) (it is also claimed that this tribe was Thracian)
Doberes
Laeaeans (also Laeaei and Laiai)
Odomantes (also Odomanti) (it is also claimed that this tribe was Thracian) 
Paeoplae
Siropaiones

See also 
List of Illyrians
List of settlements in Illyria
List of ancient tribes in Illyria

References

Sources 

Mallory, James P.; Adams, D. Q. (1997). Encyclopedia of Indo-European Culture. Routledge.  
Wilkes, John. (1996). The Illyrians. Wiley-Blackwell.  

 
Lists of ancient Indo-European peoples and tribes